Harold Gray (1894–1968) was an American cartoonist.

Harold Gray may also refer to:
 Harold E. Gray (1906–1972), American pilot and executive for Pan Am
 Harold Gray (landowner) (1867–1951), Anglo-Irish landowner, horse breeder and politician
 Harold St George Gray (1872–1963), British archaeologist
 Harold Gray (conductor) (1903–1991), British orchestral conductor
 Harold Gray (American football) (1938–1990), American football player and coach

See also
 Harold Grey (born 1971), boxer